Cindy A. Johnson is a professional basketball player who has played for the University of Delaware and several European teams, as well as Guyana's national team.

She played for the University of Delaware from 1997–2001, and was inducted into the UD hall of fame in 2008. In the 2000–01 season, with Johnson on the team, Delaware won the America East title and advanced to the NCAA Tournament, which UD had not previously achieved.  She was the UD Outstanding Female Athlete of the Year for 2001. She won all-league honors in three of the four seasons she played for UD.

As of 2008, she resided in Salt Lake City, Utah.

Delaware statistics 

Source

Pro Experience
2006 – Washington Mystics (WNBA) Free Agent Camp- Invited by Washington Mystics to Free Agent Camp
2003 – Ibiza, SPA
2002 – Grindavik; Grindavik Iceland signed as replacement on 21 January 2002. Averaged: 22.3 points, .385 3pt %, 2.3 steals, 7.3 rebs per game
2001 – Burgos; SPA
2001 – WNBA Pre-Draft Camp Participant
2000 – Caricom Championships (Barbados)- captain of Guyana Women’s National Team. Averaged: 26.3 points, 4 steals, 6 rebs per game
1998 – Caricom Championships (Belize)-co-captain of Guyana Women’s National Team. Averaged: 15.5 points, 3 steals, 5.4 rebs per game
1997 – Caricom Junior Nationals Championships (Jamaica)-Captain. Averaged: 20.1 points, 3 steals, 3.4 Assists, 6.2 rebs per game
1997 – Centro American Basketball Championships (Honduras). Averaged: 11.3 points, 5 Assists, 8 rebs per game.

References
University of Delaware – 2000–2001 Delaware Women's Basketball Outlook

Notes 

Living people
Year of birth missing (living people)
American women's basketball players
Shooting guards
Delaware Fightin' Blue Hens women's basketball players
Guyanese women's basketball players